Terje Olav Pedersen (born 9 February 1943) is a former Norwegian javelin thrower. He represented SK Vidar.
 
At the 1960 Summer Olympics he progressed from the qualifying round, but did not start in the final. At the 1964 Summer Olympics he did not qualify for the final. He became Norwegian champion in the years 1960 and 1962–1964.

Pedersen established two world records in javelin throw (with the old implement), both at Bislett stadion. The first record of 87.12 metres came in July 1964 and the second of 91.72 metres was established in September the same year. This remained his career best throw. For his world records Pedersen was selected Norwegian Sportsperson of the Year in 1964.

References

External links

1943 births
Living people
World record setters in athletics (track and field)
Athletes (track and field) at the 1960 Summer Olympics
Athletes (track and field) at the 1964 Summer Olympics
Olympic athletes of Norway
Norwegian male javelin throwers